A Nail Merchant at Nightfall is a 1949 novel by the Finnish writer Mika Waltari. It is a fictionalised and humorous account of when Waltari wrote his novel The Egyptian. It was published in English in 1954, translated by Alan Beesley.

Reception
Martin Levin of The Saturday Review described the book as "an involved little allegory in which the temptations of the flesh and the pains of authorship are almost thoroughly obscured by a series of symbolic vignettes." Kirkus Reviews wrote: "A tour de force which may, just possibly, capture the fancy of those looking for something in the vein of allegory, fantasy. ... There are bits of poetic writing here. But the appeal is special."

References

1949 Finnish novels
20th-century Finnish novels
Finnish-language novels
Novels about writers
Novels by Mika Waltari
Novels set in Egypt